Bembidion pallidipenne is a species of ground beetle native to Europe.

References

pallidipenne
Beetles described in 1802
Beetles of Europe